Daniel Thomas Nestor Sherman is a British songwriter, record producer, and publisher, who is based in London. He was a member of Neve, who had a #70 hit with a version of Y-Traxx's "Mystery Land" and co-wrote the Lisa Scott-Lee songs "Lately" and "Too Far Gone", which made #6 and #11 on the UK Singles Chart respectively.

References

British songwriters
Place of birth missing (living people)
Year of birth missing (living people)
Living people
British record producers